This is a list of Spain international footballers – football players who have played for the Spain national football team. All players with 20 or more official caps are listed here.

This table is up to date, as of 27 September 2022.

Bold denotes players still playing professional football.
 1964 – member of the 1964 European Nations' Cup winning team.
 1992 – member of the 1992 Olympics Gold Medal winning team.
 2008 – member of the UEFA Euro 2008 winning team.
 2010 – member of the 2010 FIFA World Cup winning team.
 2012 – member of the UEFA Euro 2012 winning team.

List

See also
List of Basque footballers
List of Catalan footballers
List of Spain international footballers born outside Spain

References

External links
Appearances for Spain National Team at Rec.Sport.Soccer Statistics Foundation
 Spain national team players (with province of birth) at BDFutbol
Todos los jugadores (all the players) at Selección Española de Fútbol (official site)

 Spain
Association football player non-biographical articles